The 2019–20 Presbyterian Blue Hose men's basketball team represented Presbyterian College in the 2019–20 NCAA Division I men's basketball season. The Blue Hose, led by first-year head coach Quinton Ferrell, played their home games at the Templeton Physical Education Center in Clinton, South Carolina, as members of the Big South Conference. They finished the season 10–22, 7–11 in Big South play to finish in a three-way tie for seventh place. They lost in the first round of the Big South tournament to Charleston Southern.

Previous season
The Blue Hose finished the 2018–19 season 20–16 overall, 9–7 in Big South play to finish in a tie for fifth place. In the Big South tournament, they defeated UNC Asheville in the first round, before falling to Radford in the quarterfinals. The Blue Hose received an invitation to the CIT, where they beat Seattle in the first round, Robert Morris in the second round, before falling to Marshall in the quarterfinals.

On March 28, 2019, it was announced that former head coach Dustin Kerns was named the new head coach at Appalachian State. On April 11, 2019, former assistant coach at College of Charleston and Presbyterian alum Quinton Ferrell was announced as Kerns' replacement.

Roster

Schedule and results

|-
!colspan=12 style=| Exhibition

|-
!colspan=12 style=| Non-conference regular season

|-
!colspan=9 style=| Big South Conference regular season

|-
!colspan=12 style=| Big South tournament
|-

|-

Source

References

Presbyterian Blue Hose men's basketball seasons
Presbyterian Blue Hose
Presbyterian Blue Hose men's basketball
Presbyterian Blue Hose men's basketball